The Later Qin (384–417), also known as Yao Qin, was a state ruled by the Qiang ethnicity of the Sixteen Kingdoms during the Jin dynasty (266–420) in China. The Later Qin is entirely distinct from the Qin dynasty, the Former Qin and the Western Qin.

Its second ruler, Yao Xing, supported the propagation of Buddhism by the Madhyamakin monk Kumārajīva.

All rulers of the Later Qin declared themselves emperors, but for a substantial part of Yao Xing's reign, he used the title Tian Wang.

Rulers of the Later Qin

Rulers family tree

See also
Ethnic groups in Chinese history
Five Barbarians
Chinese Buddhism
Emperor Wu of Liu Song
Helian Bobo

Notes and references 

 
Dynasties in Chinese history
Former countries in Chinese history
384 establishments